Marvin Crawford (July 30, 1932 – January 10, 2004) was an American cross-country skier. He competed in the men's relay event at the 1956 Winter Olympics.

References

External links
 

1932 births
2004 deaths
American male cross-country skiers
American male Nordic combined skiers
Olympic cross-country skiers of the United States
Olympic Nordic combined skiers of the United States
Cross-country skiers at the 1956 Winter Olympics
Nordic combined skiers at the 1956 Winter Olympics
Skiers from Denver